A venomoid is a venomous snake that has undergone a surgical procedure to remove or inhibit its production of venom. This procedure has been used for venomous snakes kept as pets or used in public demonstrations in order to remove the risk of injury or death when handled. The removal of venom glands or fangs of exhibited animals may be by surgery or simple mutilation; some or all of these procedures have been considered illegal and unethical. Removal of fangs is uncommon, as snakes frequently regenerate teeth, and the more invasive procedure of removing the underlying maxillary bone would be fatal. Most venomoid procedures consist of either removing the venom gland itself, or severing the duct between the gland and the fang. However, the duct and gland have been known to regenerate, and supposedly "safe" snakes have killed mice and successfully envenomated humans.

Advocates of this procedure state that it is done for safety reasons and have published methods for this surgery.  However, this procedure is highly controversial among herpetologists, and is considered animal cruelty by many experts on venomous snakes, particularly in reference to the procedure being performed by unlicensed hobbyists with inadequate analgesia. For instance, a veterinarian review on reptile surgery published in 2006 stated that "such practices should be discouraged" due to both ethical and animal welfare concerns.

Legality in Australia 
Legal questions have been raised about amateur venomoid surgeries in Australia. The Australian 1986 Prevention of Cruelty to Animals Act states that animals must be anesthetized for the duration of an operation. In 2007, the Victoria state government amended the Prevention of Cruelty to Animals Act 1986 to ban the removal of venom glands from snakes unless performed for a therapeutic reason by a registered veterinarian. In addition, in a case involving the reptile showman and self-styled herpetologist Raymond Hoser, a 2008 tribunal ruled that venomoid snakes cannot be handled by members of the public in Victoria, due to the risk of the venom glands regrowing.

See also
Snake charming
Docking (animal)
Onychectomy
Veterinary ethics

References

Snakes
Cruelty to animals
Animal welfare